Switzerland participated at the Eurovision Song Contest 2005 with the song "Cool Vibes" written by David Brandes, Jane Tempest and John O'Flynn. The song was performed by the band Vanilla Ninja, which was internally selected by the Swiss broadcaster SRG SSR idée suisse in November 2004 to represent the nation at the 2005 contest in Kyiv, Ukraine. "Cool Vibes" was presented to the public as the Swiss song during the show Congratulations - 50 Jahre Eurovision Song Contest on 5 March 2005.

Switzerland competed in the semi-final of the Eurovision Song Contest which took place on 19 May 2005. Performing during the show in position 19, "Cool Vibes" was announced among the top 10 entries of the semi-final and therefore qualified to compete in the final on 21 May. It was later revealed that Switzerland placed eighth out of the 25 participating countries in the semi-final with 114 points. In the final, Switzerland performed in position 22 and placed eighth out of the 24 participating countries, scoring 128 points.

Background

Prior to the 2005 contest, Switzerland had participated in the Eurovision Song Contest forty-five times since its first entry in 1956. Switzerland is noted for having won the first edition of the Eurovision Song Contest with the song "Refrain" performed by Lys Assia. Their second and, to this point, most recent victory was achieved in 1988 when Canadian singer Céline Dion won the contest with the song "Ne partez pas sans moi". In 2004, Switzerland earned one of their lowest results of all-time, with Piero Esteriore and the MusicStars and their song "Celebrate" placing last in the semi-final without earning a single point.

The Swiss national broadcaster, SRG SSR idée suisse, broadcasts the event within Switzerland and organises the selection process for the nation's entry. SRG SSR idée suisse confirmed their intentions to participate at the 2005 Eurovision Song Contest on 14 July 2004. Along with their participation confirmation, the broadcaster also announced that the Swiss entry for the 2005 contest would be selected internally. Switzerland has selected their entry for the Eurovision Song Contest through both national finals and internal selections in the past. Since 1998, the broadcaster has opted to organize a national final in order to select the Swiss entry.

Before Eurovision

Internal selection 

SRG SSR idée suisse opened a submission period between 14 July 2004 and 15 October 2004 for interested artists and composers to submit their entries. Eligible artists were those that have had television and stage experience (live performances), have made at least one video and have released at least one CD which placed among the top 50 in an official chart. In addition to the public application, the broadcaster was also in contact with individual composers and lyricists as well as the music industry to be involved in the selection process. 

On 2 November 2004, Estonian tabloid SL Õhtuleht claimed that the Estonian band Vanilla Ninja had been selected to represent Switzerland in Kyiv, which was subsequently confirmed by SRG SSR idée suisse on 9 November 2004. Vanilla Ninja had previously attempted to represent Estonia at the Eurovision Song Contest in 2003, placing ninth in the national final Eurolaul 2003 with the song "Club Kung-Fu". It was also announced that their song had been written and produced by David Brandes. Both the artist and song were selected by a jury panel consisting of representatives of the three broadcasters in Switzerland: the Swiss-German/Romansh broadcaster Schweizer Fernsehen der deutschen und rätoromanischen Schweiz (SF DRS), the Swiss-French broadcaster Télévision Suisse Romande (TSR) and the Swiss-Italian broadcaster Televisione svizzera di lingua italiana (TSI).

"Cool Vibes" was presented to the public as the song on 5 March 2005 during the show Congratulations - 50 Jahre Eurovision Song Contest, which celebrated the 50th anniversary of the Eurovision Song Contest. The show was hosted by Sandra Studer and was televised on SF DRS, TSI with Italian commentary by Marco Blaser and TSR with French commentary by Jean-Marc Richard. In addition to the song presentation, former Swiss Eurovision Song Contest entrants appeared during the show as guests: Lys Assia (1956, 1957, 1958), Paola (1969, 1980), Peter Reber (1971, 1976, 1979 and 1981), Pepe Lienhard (1977), Francine Jordi (2002) and Piero Esteriore (2004). "Cool Vibes" was written by David Brandes together with Jane Tempest and John O'Flynn.

At Eurovision
According to Eurovision rules, all nations with the exceptions of the host country, the "Big Four" (France, Germany, Spain and the United Kingdom), and the ten highest placed finishers in the 2004 contest are required to qualify from the semi-final on 19 May 2005 in order to compete for the final on 21 May 2005; the top ten countries from the semi-final progress to the final. On 22 March 2005, a special allocation draw was held which determined the running order for the semi-final and Switzerland was set to perform in position 19, following the entry from Andorra and before the entry from Croatia. At the end of the show, Switzerland was announced as having finished in the top 10 and subsequently qualifying for the grand final. It was later revealed that Switzerland placed eighth in the semi-final, receiving a total of 114 points. The draw for the running order for the final was done by the presenters during the announcement of the ten qualifying countries during the semi-final and Switzerland was drawn to perform in position 22, following the entry from Bosnia and Herzegovina and before the entry from Latvia. Switzerland placed eighth in the final, scoring 128 points.

In Switzerland, three broadcasters that form SRG SSR idée suisse aired both shows of the contest. 1991 Swiss Eurovision Song Contest entrant Sandra Studer provided German commentary on SF DRS, Jean-Marc Richard and Marie-Thérèse Porche provided French commentary on TSR, while Daniela Tami and Claudio Lazzarino provided Italian commentary on TSI. The Swiss spokesperson, who announced the Swiss votes during the final, was Cécile Bähler.

Voting 
Below is a breakdown of points awarded to Switzerland and awarded by Switzerland in the semi-final and grand final of the contest. The nation awarded its 12 points to Portugal in the semi-final and to Serbia and Montenegro in the final of the contest.

Points awarded to Switzerland

Points awarded by Switzerland

References

2005
Countries in the Eurovision Song Contest 2005
Eurovision